Khvajeh Mohammad Safavi was a son of Shaykh Junayd, leader of the Safavid order (1447–1460), born by a Circassian concubine. He was an older (half)-brother of Shaykh Haydar, the successor of Shaykh Junayd as leader of the Safavid order, and therefore an uncle of the founder of the Safavid dynasty, Ismail I (1501–1524). He had another brother named Khvajeh Jamshid, who was killed in southern Dagestan during one of Shaykh Haydar's campaigns. Khvajeh Mohammad's only surviving sister, Shah-Pasha Khatun, was married to Mohammad Beg Talish, a military chief from Khalkhal who would later become guardian (laleh) to Ismail I and play a pivotal role in his ascension to power in the early 16th century.

References

Sources
 
 

15th-century births
Iranian people of Circassian descent
15th-century Iranian people
Safaviyeh order
Safavid dynasty
Year of death unknown